Himalaya Barad (born 28 August 1989) is an Indian cricketer. He made his List A debut for Gujarat in the 2013–14 Vijay Hazare Trophy on 27 February 2014.

References

External links
 

1989 births
Living people
Indian cricketers
Gujarat cricketers
Cricketers from Ahmedabad
Wicket-keepers